K. Hunishikatti is a village in Dharwad district of Karnataka, India.

Demographics 
As of the 2011 Census of India there are 218 households in K. Hunishikatti and a total population of 1,045 consisting of 554 males and 491 females. There are 164 children ages 0-6.

References

Villages in Dharwad district